Portugaliae Acta Biologica is a biannual peer-reviewed scientific journal covering research in all areas of botany especially of Iberian and Macaronesian cryptogams. It is published by the Botanical Garden of the University of Lisbon and was established in 1944. Until 1999, the journal was published in two separate series, A and B, the first dedicated to morphology, physiology, and general biology, and the second to systematics, ecology, biogeography, and paleontology. The editors-in-chief are Amélia Martins-Loução, Fernando Catarino, and Ireneia Melo.

External links

Botany journals
Publications established in 1945
Multilingual journals